see also Aurélien, a 1944 novel by Louis Aragon.

Aurélien is a French masculine given name and may refer to:
Aurélien Agbénonci (born 1958), Beninese diplomat
Aurélien Barrau (born 1973), French physicist and philosopher
Aurélien Bélanger (1878–1953), Canadian politician 
Aurélien Bellanger (born 1980), French writer and actor
Aurélien Boche (born 1981), French footballer
Aurélien Brulé (b. 1979), French founder of Kalaweit Project
Aurélien Capoue (born 1982), French footballer
Aurélien Chedjou (born 1986), Cameroonian footballer
Aurélien Clerc (born 1979), Swiss road bicycle racer 
Aurélien Collin (born 1986), French footballer 
Aurélien Cologni (born 1978), French rugby player and coach
Aurélien Cotentin, aka Orelsan (born 1982), French rapper, songwriter and record producer 
Aurélien Faivre (born 1978), French footballer
Aurélien Gill (born 1933), Canadian politician
Aurélien Hérisson (born 1990), Brazilian-born French footballer
Aurélien Joachim (born 1986), Luxembourgish footballer
Aurélien Kahn (born 1968), French equestrian and Olympic competitor
Aurélien Marie Lugné aka Lugné-Poe (1869–1940), French actor, theatre director and scenic designer
Aurélien Mazel (born 1982), French footballer
Aurélien Montaroup (born 1985), French footballer
Aurélien Nattes (born 1984), French footballer
Aurélien Ngeyitala (born 1994), Congolese footballer 
Aurélien Noël (1904–1991), Canadian politician
Aurélien Panis (born 1994), French racing driver
Aurélien Passeron (born 1984), French road racing cyclist
Aurélien Recoing (born 1958), French actor
Aurélien Rougerie (born 1980), French rugby player
Aurélien Sauvageot (1897–1988), French linguist
Aurélien Scholl (1833–1902), French author and journalist
Aurélien Taché (born 1984), French politician
Aurélien Tchouaméni (born 2000), French footballer
Aurélien Wiik (born 1980), French actor and filmmaker

French masculine given names